Full Throttle is an energy drink brand produced by Monster Beverage. It debuted in late 2004 in the United States and Canada under its former owner The Coca-Cola Company. It is known for its sponsorship of National Hot Rod Association competitions from 2008 to 2012.

On June 12, 2015, Monster Beverage closed on the deal to acquire The Coca-Cola Company's energy drinks line. Coca-Cola transferred ownership of all of its worldwide energy businesses including NOS, Full Throttle and nine smaller brands to Monster. Monster transferred all of its non-energy drink businesses to Coca-Cola, including Hansen's natural sodas, Peace Tea, Hubert's Lemonade, and Hansen's juice products.

Full Throttle Coffee

Full Throttle released three coffee energy drinks of its own in the flavors Caramel, Vanilla, and Mocha in Southeast and Pacific Northwest markets. Coca-Cola claims it was made with "100% premium Arabica coffee", and it was available in 15oz cans, just like Monster's Java line and Rockstar's Roasted line. The drink's tagline was "Coffee. Fully Charged" prior to it being discontinued.

Current drinks
Full Throttle Original Citrus
Full Throttle Blue Agave/Blue Demon
Full Throttle True Blue

Discontinued drinks

Full Throttle Orange
Full Throttle Red Berry
Full Throttle Original Citrus Sugar Free
Full Throttle Night
Full Throttle Fury Berry
Full Throttle Fury Orange
Full Throttle Fury Blue
Full Throttle Fury Berry Sugar Free
Full Throttle Mother
Full Throttle Unleaded
Full Throttle Hydration
Full Throttle Coffee Vanilla
Full Throttle Coffee Mocha
Full Throttle Coffee Caramel
Full Throttle Twisted (Fountain Exclusive)

References

Coca-Cola brands
Energy drinks
Food and drink introduced in 2004

it:Burn (energy drink)